"Man of the Woods" is a song by American singer-songwriter Justin Timberlake. It was released as the fourth and final single from his fifth studio album of the same name on February 2, 2018, alongside the album. The song was produced by the Neptunes duo members Pharrell Williams and Chad Hugo, and it was additionally produced by Timberlake, while all three wrote it. Its music video was directed by Paul Hunter and released on the same day.

Music video
Directed by Paul Hunter, the video was released the same day as the song and album. The clip sees Timberlake making a journey across a rugged landscape. During most of the video, Timberlake is looking straight into the camera, as it is filmed from his wife Jessica Biel's perspective until the singer encounters her. Eventually, he enters a log cabin, wherein he shares a ballroom dance with Biel. As described by a The Hollywood Reporter editor, the video "leans into the folky, campfire imagery of the album's title."

Charts

References

2018 songs
Justin Timberlake songs
Music videos directed by Paul Hunter (director)
Song recordings produced by Justin Timberlake
Song recordings produced by the Neptunes
Songs written by Chad Hugo
Songs written by Justin Timberlake
Songs written by Pharrell Williams